The West London Hospital was founded in 1856 as the Fulham and Hammersmith General Dispensary, which was housed in a small 6-roomed building in Queen Street, Hammersmith. It catered for acute conditions and later for geriatric, maternity, rehabilitation and long-stay conditions.

History
Increasing demand led to the leasing of larger premises of Elm Tree House in Hammersmith Road in 1860. At this time it began to admit in-patients, mainly victims of industrial accidents. In 1863 it was renamed the West London Hospital. It was granted a Royal Charter on 1 November 1894. During the First World War 36 of its beds reserved for sick and wounded servicemen.

In February 1925 Princess Mary opened a new wing financed by a Mr Dan Mason. This had an accident ward of 16 beds, cancer wards, each of 7 beds, for male and female patients, 26 rooms for private patients and 2 operating theatres.  Private patients were charged 5 guineas (£5.25) a week for a single room and 4 guineas (£4.20) for a double room. In 1937 a new block on the eastern corner of the Hospital was added - the Silver Jubilee Extension - and was officially opened by Queen Mary.

The hospital's accident and emergency department closed in the 1970s when Charing Cross Hospital moved from central London to new premises in Fulham Palace Road. In 1993 its remaining services were moved to the Chelsea and Westminster Hospital in Fulham Road. The building was sold and refurbished as offices and named Saunders House. The facade is listed and has been preserved. Sony Ericsson currently rent the building now renamed Sony Ericsson House. The freehold is owned by a Middle Eastern investor.

References

Hospital buildings completed in 1856
Defunct hospitals in London
1856 establishments in England